Agelasta is a genus of longhorn beetles of the subfamily Lamiinae.

Species 
Agelasta contains the following species:

 Subgenus Agelasta
 Agelasta albomaculata Breuning, 1958
 Agelasta albomarmorata Breuning, 1947
 Agelasta albostictica Breuning, 1980
 Agelasta basispreta Heller, 1923
 Agelasta estrellae Hüdepohl, 1985
 Agelasta humerata Breuning, 1939
 Agelasta imogenae Hüdepohl, 1985
 Agelasta isthmicola Heller, 1923
 Agelasta lacteospreta Heller, 1923
 Agelasta lacteostictica Breuning, 1960
 Agelasta luzonica Breuning, 1937
 Agelasta marionae Hüdepohl, 1985
 Agelasta mediofasciata Heller, 1913
 Agelasta milagrosae Hüdepohl, 1985
 Agelasta mindanaonis Breuning, 1939
 Agelasta ocellifera (Westwood, 1863)
 Agelasta pardalina Heller, 1924
 Agelasta pardalis Breuning, 1974
 Agelasta szetschuanica Breuning, 1967
 Agelasta transversa Newman, 1842
 Agelasta transversefasciata Breuning, 1939
 Agelasta transversesignata Breuning, 1939
 Agelasta undulata Breuning, 1939
 Agelasta unicolor Breuning, 1962

 Subgenus Antennagelasta
 Agelasta perakensis Breuning, 1968

 Subgenus Dissosira
 Agelasta albomaculata Breuning, 1957
 Agelasta andamanica (Breuning, 1935)
 Agelasta annamensis (Breuning, 1938)
 Agelasta bimaculata Breuning, 1938
 Agelasta cana Breuning, 1939
 Agelasta catenata Pascoe, 1862
 Agelasta catenatoides Yamasako & Ohbayashi, 2009
 Agelasta columba (Pascoe, 1859)
 Agelasta elongata Breuning, 1963
 Agelasta gardneri (Breuning, 1938)
 Agelasta griseonotata Pic, 1944
 Agelasta illecideosa (Breuning, 1967)
 Agelasta konoi (Hayashi, 1956)
 Agelasta kumei (Takakuwa, 1991)
 Agelasta lecideosa (Pascoe, 1865)
 Agelasta mima (J. Thomson, 1868)
 Agelasta mixta Gahan, 1895
 Agelasta mouhotii Pascoe, 1862
 Agelasta nigrolineata Breuning, 1968
 Agelasta nigromaculata Gahan, 1894
 Agelasta nigropunctata (Breuning, 1938)
 Agelasta nigrostictica (Breuning, 1967)
 Agelasta perplexa (Pascoe, 1858)
 Agelasta postvittata Breuning, 1939
 Agelasta praelongipes (Kusama & Irie, 1976)
 Agelasta quadrimaculata (Gahan, 1890)
 Agelasta riouensis (Breuning, 1935)
 Agelasta rufa (Breuning, 1935)
 Agelasta siamana (Breuning, 1974)
 Agelasta siamensis Breuning, 1956
 Agelasta sikkimensis Breuning, 1963
 Agelasta tonkinea Pic, 1925
 Agelasta villosipes Breuning, 1939
 Agelasta yonaguni (Hayashi, 1962)
 Agelasta yunnanensis Breuning, 1954

 Subgenus Epagelasta
 Agelasta balteata Pascoe, 1866
 Agelasta newmanni White, 1856

 Subgenus Mesolophus
 Agelasta annamana Breuning, 1956
 Agelasta birmanensis (Breuning, 1935)
 Agelasta cameroni Breuning, 1978
 Agelasta dayremi Breuning, 1938
 Agelasta densemarmorata Breuning, 1968
 Agelasta humeralis (Gahan, 1894)
 Agelasta marmorata (Pic, 1927)
 Agelasta pici Breuning, 1938
 Agelasta striata Hüdepohl, 1990
 Agelasta yunnana Chiang, 1963

 Subgenus Metagelasta
 Agelasta albomaculata (Aurivillius, 1920)
 Agelasta basimaculata Heller, 1934
 Agelasta basimaculatoides Breuning, 1980

 Subgenus Paragelasta
 Agelasta robinsoni (Gahan, 1906)

 Subgenus Parasaimia
 Agelasta alboplagiata (Breuning, 1935)
 Agelasta glabrofasciata (Pic, 1917)
 Agelasta laosensis (Pic, 1925)
 Agelasta latefasciata Breuning, 1939

 Subgenus Pseudagelasta
 Agelasta bifasciana (White, 1858)
 Agelasta birmanica (Breuning, 1935)
 Agelasta cristata Breuning, 1938
 Agelasta fallaciosa Breuning, 1939
 Agelasta hirsutula Breuning, 1939

 Incertae sedis
 Agelasta obscura McLeay, 1884

References 

 
Mesosini
Cerambycidae genera